Claire Morgan (born 1980 in Belfast, Northern Ireland) is an Irish artist. She lives and works in the North East of England.

Biography 
Morgan was born in Belfast, Northern Ireland. She studied at Northumbria University in Newcastle upon Tyne, graduating with a BA Hons in Fine Art Sculpture in 2003.

Her work is inspired by the cycles of nature and the problematic relationships between humans and nature, as well as personal experiences and memories of trauma.

Morgan started out working with temporary materials such as rotting fruit and other organic materials. She is known for suspended installations that often include taxidermy, and also for intricate works on paper.

Selected solo exhibitions 
 2021 – Claire Morgan: Joy in the pain, Saarlandmuseum Moderne Galerie, Saarbrücken, Germany
 2019 – Claire Morgan: As I Live and Breathe, The Horniman Museum and Gardens, London, UK
 2018 – Claire Morgan: Losses, Deyrolle, Paris, France
 2018 – Claire Morgan: Here is the End of All Things, Kunstverein Emsdetten, Germany
 2018 – Claire Morgan: Recent Lapses in Judgement, Galerie Karsten Greve, Köln, Germany
 2017 – Claire Morgan: My God-shaped Hole, Fondation Francès, Senlis, France
 2017 – Claire Morgan: Stop Me Feeling, Frist Art Museum, Nashville, US
 2016 – Claire Morgan: The Sound of Silence, Het Noordbrabants Museum, Den Bosch, Netherlands
 2016 – Claire Morgan: Plenty More Fish In The Sea, Angers
 2015 – Claire Morgan: The Gathering Dusk, Musée de la Chasse et de la Nature, France
 2014 – Claire Morgan: Try Again. Fail Again. Fail Better. Osthaus Museum, Hagen, Germany
 2015 – Claire Morgan: Try Again. Fail Again. Fail Better. Stadtmuseum Jena, Jena, Germany
 2015 – Claire Morgan: Try Again. Fail Again. Fail Better. , Saint-Louis, France
 2015 – Claire Morgan: Act of God // Höhere Gewalt, Kunst-Station Sankt Peter, Köln, Germany
 2013 – Claire Morgan: Interference, Nässjö Konsthall, Sweden
 2013 – Claire Morgan: Arresting, Sweden
 2012 – Claire Morgan: Gone to Seed, MAC, Belfast, Northern Ireland
 2012 – Claire Morgan: Quietus, Galerie Karsten Greve, Paris, France
 2012 – Claire Morgan: Menagerie, Kunstverein Münsterland, Coesfeld, Germany
 2011 – Claire Morgan: About Time, Hub: National Centre for Craft and Design, Sleaford, UK
 2010 – Claire Morgan: Life. Blood, Galerie Karsten Greve, Paris, France
 2008 – Claire Morgan: Gone with the Wind, Great North Run Cultural Programme, Laing Art Gallery, Newcastle, UK
 2008 – Claire Morgan: Chasing Rainbows, Selfridges (Wonder Room Windows), London, UK

Awards 
 2019 – Fondation Daniel et Florence Guerlain, Prix de Dessin 2019 FR
 2007 – Wooda Arts Award, Cornwall UK
 2006 – Premio Fondazione Arnaldo Pomodoro, Prize for Young Sculptors, Milan IT
 2004 – Roy Noakes Award, selected by Royal British Society of Sculptors UK
 2004 – Royal British Society of Sculptors, Annual Bursary Award UK

Selected collections 
 Centre Georges Pompidou
 MONA Museum of Old and New Art
 
 Emerige
 ALTANA Kulturstiftung
 Renschdael Art Foundation
 Fondation Frances
 Ghisla Art Foundation
 ERES Foundation
 EIB Institute

References

External links 
 Artist website
 Galerie Karsten Greve
 Madame Figaro Interview
 Environmental Graffiti

1980 births
Living people
Artists from Northern Ireland
Artists from Belfast
Artists from London
Alumni of Northumbria University
Alumni of Ulster University
21st-century women artists from Northern Ireland
Women sculptors
British artists